LX or Lx may refer to:

Arts and entertainment
 LX (rapper), of 187 Strassenbande
 LX (TV network), local news online and over-the-air network
 LXTV, a lifestyle and entertainment TV programming production unit of NBCUniversal

Electronics and software
 HP LX series, a palmtop computer series
 OpenMandriva Lx, a Linux distribution
 Pentax LX, a camera
 SPARCstation LX, a workstation
 T-Mobile Sidekick LX, a smartphone

Science and mathematics
 60 (number) in Roman numerals
 Lux (symbol: lx), the SI derived unit of illuminance
 Linear Executable, the executable file format used by OS/2
 Lipoxin, in medicine

Transportation

Air transport
 Swiss International Air Lines, IATA airline code LX

Automobiles
 Aion LX, a Chinese electric mid-size SUV
 Chrysler LX platform, an American automobile platform
 Exeed LX, a Chinese luxury compact SUV
 Lexus LX, a Japanese luxury full-size SUV
 Lotus LX, a one-off version of the Lotus Elite

Motorcycles
 Vespa LX, a series of Italian scooters

Trucks
 MAN LX and FX ranges of tactical trucks, a range of Dutch tactical trucks

Other uses
 Lisbon, Portugal, commonly abbreviated as "LX" or "Lx"
 LX Cycling Team, from South Korea

See also